Josué Mayard (born October 3, 1980) is a former Haitian international soccer player who played as a defender. Throughout his playing career, he had stints in Europe, Major League Soccer, and the USL A-League.

Club career
Mayard began his professional career in 2000 with the Montreal Impact of the USL A-League where he had an impressive rookie campaign, recording 4 goals and 2 assists in only 13 games. After having an impressive campaign with the Impact he signed for Dallas Burn of the Major League Soccer. He split the 2002 season between the Dallas Burn and Kansas City Wizards playing only three matches with Dallas. Mayard returned to the A-League to sign with the Toronto Lynx his signing was announced in a press conference on April 30, 2003. He made his debut for the club on May 3, 2003 against Pittsburgh Riverhounds.

He re-signed with Toronto for the 2004 season his signing was announced on April 7, 2004. Throughout the 2004 season the Lynx failed to acquire a playoff berth. Mayard returned for his third stint with the organization on April 19, 2005. On June 21, 2005 Mayard was traded to the Vancouver Whitecaps in exchange for Said Ali. With the Caps he helped the team make the playoffs reaching the semi-finals but losing to Richmond Kickers in a penalty shootout.

In 2006, he went abroad to Norway and signed with Pors Grenland in the Norwegian First Division playing 26 games and scoring 4 goals. In 2007, he moved to league rivals Notodden FK, and appeared in 14 matches.

International career
Although he is a Canadian citizen, due to his Haitian heritage he was able to compete for the Haiti national football team in their quest to qualify for the 2002 World Cup, making his debut for Haiti against Honduras. He also helped the team qualify for the 2007 CONCACAF Gold Cup. He did not however make their Gold Cup squad.

Personal life
Mayard has two brothers who also play professional soccer; Pierre-Rudolph and Elkana Mayard.

References

External links
 

1980 births
Living people
Association football defenders
Canadian sportspeople of Haitian descent
Expatriate footballers in Norway
Expatriate soccer players in the United States
FC Dallas draft picks
FC Dallas players
Haiti international footballers
Haitian expatriate footballers
Haitian expatriate sportspeople in the United States
Haitian footballers
Major League Soccer players
Montreal Impact (1992–2011) players
Nashville Metros players
Norwegian First Division players
Notodden FK players
Pors Grenland players
Soccer players from Montreal
Sporting Kansas City players
Toronto Lynx players
A-League (1995–2004) players
USL First Division players
Vancouver Whitecaps (1986–2010) players